Singa  is a market center in Beni Municipality in Myagdi District in the Dhaulagiri Zone of western-central Nepal. The former village development committee was annexed to form the new municipality on May 18, 2014. At the time of the 1991 Nepal census it had a population of 2666 people living in 555 individual households.

References

External links
UN map of the municipalities of Myagdi District

Populated places in Myagdi District